The 2004 Harris British Open Championships was held at the Albert Hall, Nottingham from 31 October – 6 November 2004. David Palmer retained his title defeating Amr Shabana in the final.

Seeds

Draw and results

Main draw

References

Men's British Open Squash Championships
Squash in England
Men's British Open
Men's British Open Squash Championship
2000s in Nottingham
Sport in Nottingham
Men's British Open Squash Championship
Men's British Open Squash Championship